is a passenger railway station in located in the town of Kihoku, Kitamuro District, Mie Prefecture, Japan, operated by Central Japan Railway Company (JR Tōkai).

Lines

Station layout
The station consists of two opposed side platforms connected to the station building by a footbridge.

Platforms

History 
Aiga Station opened on 19 December 1934, on the Japanese Government Railways (JGR) Kisei East Line. The JGR became the Japanese National Railways (JNR) after World War 2, and the line was extended to Kuki Station by January 12, 1957. The line was renamed the Kisei Main Line on 15 July 1959. The station was absorbed into the JR Central network upon the privatization of JNR on 1 April 1987.

Passenger statistics
In fiscal 2019, the station was used by an average of 122 passengers daily (boarding passengers only).

Surrounding area
Kihoku Municipal Shionan Junior High School
Kihoku Town Miyama Library
Kihoku Municipal Aiga Elementary School

See also
List of railway stations in Japan

References

External links

Railway stations in Japan opened in 1934
Railway stations in Mie Prefecture
Kihoku, Mie